Weaving ulap Doyo or Cain ulap Doyo is an art weave cloth of the tribe of Benuaq in Cape Isuy, District Kutai, Samarinda, East Kalimantan. Doyo called because its main ingredient is fiber leaf Doyo. Doyo leaf chosen as woven material as strong fiber to be used as thread. Benuaq tribal women make woven in the form of clothing, bag, shirt, pants, wallet, and so forth.

See also

 Tenun
 Ikat
 National costume of Indonesia

References 

East Kalimantan